72nd Anniversary Stadium (Bang Mod) or Chalerm Phrakiat Bang Mod Stadium is a multi-purpose stadium in Thung Khru, Bangkok, Thailand. The stadium built for celebration of the 72nd Birthday Anniversary of King Bhumibol Adulyadej, hence the name of the venue. It is currently used mostly for football matches and is the home stadium of Bangkok F.C.  The stadium holds 8,000 people.

References

Football venues in Thailand
Multi-purpose stadiums in Thailand
Sports venues in Bangkok
Sports venues completed in 1988
1988 establishments in Thailand